is a former international table tennis player from Japan.

Career

Table tennis 
He won a bronze medal at the 1971 World Table Tennis Championships with Yujiro Imano and another with Shigeo Itoh at the 1975 World Table Tennis Championships.

See also
 List of table tennis players
 List of World Table Tennis Championships medalists

References

Japanese male table tennis players
Living people
Year of birth missing (living people)
World Table Tennis Championships medalists